The Campeonato Nacional de Rugby Divisão de Honra (more commonly known as the Divisão de Honra) is Portugal's top level professional men's rugby union competition. The Divisão de Honra Championships are organised by the Federação Portuguesa de Rugby (Portuguese Rugby Federation) and currently consists of 12 teams. The  last placed team in the competition is relegated at the end of the season to the Campeonato Nacional de Rugby I Divisão (Portugal's second level of men's rugby union) with one team from the second-tier competition promoting to the Divisão de Honra.

Format 
The Divisão de Honra season takes place between September and March, with three teams being randomly drawn into four groups, playing each other home and away twice for a total of 6 matches per group (24 matches in total). Points are awarded according to the following:
4 points for a win
2 points for a draw
1 bonus point is awarded to a team scoring 4 tries or more in a match
1 bonus point is awarded to a team that loses a match by 7 points or fewer

The highest placed teams with the highest number of points within each group will meet each other in a round-robin play-off to determine the champions of the Divisão de Honra while to bottom placed teams in each group will play in a round-robin play-out to determine which team (that finishes last place) will be relegated in the respective season.

Promotion and relegation 
The bottom team in the relegation play-out is relegated to the Campeonato Nacional de Rugby I Divisão, while the team that finishes 1st in the second tier of rugby union competitions in Portugal will replace the latter.

Current Teams 
Note: Flags indicate national union as has been defined under WR eligibility rules. Players may hold more than one non-WR nationality

Portuguese rugby champions 

1958–1959 : Belenenses
1959–1960 : Benfica
1960–1961 : Benfica
1961–1962 : Benfica
1962–1963 : Belenenses
1963–1964 : CDUL
1964–1965 : CDUL
1965–1966 : CDUL
1966–1967 : CDUL
1967–1968 : CDUL
1968–1969 : CDUL
1969–1970 : Benfica
1970–1971 : CDUL
1971–1972 : CDUL
1972–1973 : Belenenses
1973–1974 : CDUL
1974–1975 : Belenenses
1975–1976 : Benfica
1976–1977 : Académica
1977–1978 : CDUL
1978–1979 : Académica
1979–1980 : CDUL
1980–1981 : Técnico
1981–1982 : CDUL
1982–1983 : CDUL
1983–1984 : CDUL
1984–1985 : CDUL
1985–1986 : Benfica
1986–1987 : Cascais
1987–1988 : Benfica
1988–1989 : CDUL
1989–1990 : CDUL
1990–1991 : Benfica
1991–1992 : Cascais
1992–1993 : Cascais
1993–1994 : Cascais
1994–1995 : Cascais
1995–1996 : Cascais
1996–1997 : Académica
1997–1998 : Técnico
1998–1999 : Direito
1999–2000 : Direito

Campeonato Nacional Honra

See also 
Campeonato Nacional de Rugby I Divisão
Campeonato Nacional de Rugby II Divisão
Taça de Portugal de Rugby
Supertaça de Portugal de Rugby
Copa Ibérica de Rugby/Taça Iberica de Rugby
Rugby union in Portugal

External links 
 Portuguese Rugby Federation Official Website

Rugby union leagues in Portugal
National rugby union premier leagues
Sports leagues established in 1958
1958 establishments in Portugal
Port